Oggy Oggy is a French preschool computer-animated streaming television series created by Jean Cayrol & Cédric Guarneri and is produced by Xilam Animation with the participation of Netflix and France Televisions. It is a spin-off and prequel to Oggy and the Cockroaches based on the character by Jean-Yves Raimbaud and billed as the first French Netflix Original animated series. It was released on August 24, 2021.

Plot 
The series follows Oggy as a kitten, who goes on cockroach-free adventures with his friends (Mallow and Sporty) in a world where everything's made out of kid toys.

Characters
Oggy - a kitten with a light blue body, black dotted eyes, red nose, white stomach and feet.
Mallow - a kitten with yellow glasses, light green polo, black overalls, and white shoes with grey laces.
Sporty - a kitten with white sports visor, dark green polo, white shorts and shoes with two stripes on each side.

Episode list

International Broadcast
The series globally premiered on Netflix on August 24, 2021.

On January 29, 2021, Xilam announced that France Télévisions (for France 5), Discovery Italy (for Frisbee) and Super RTL had acquired French, Italian and German TV broadcast rights to the series. The series will premiere on the respective networks in 2022.

On July 6, 2022, Channel 5 acquired the UK television broadcast rights to the series for their Milkshake! strand.

Merchandise 
On October 25, 2021, Xilam named Simba Dickie Group as the global toy partner for the series. The toy range will consist of plush toys, figures, playsets, vehicles, and collectables.

References

External links

 

2020s French animated television series
2020s preschool education television series
2021 French television series debuts
French-language Netflix original programming
French children's animated comedy television series
French children's animated adventure television series
French computer-animated television series
French animated television spin-offs
French preschool education television series
Animated preschool education television series
Animated television series about cats
Animated television series about children
Child versions of cartoon characters
Netflix children's programming
Animated television series without speech
Xilam